The Robert V. Geasey Trophy is awarded to the most outstanding men's basketball player in the Philadelphia Big 5, an informal association of college athletic programs in Philadelphia, Pennsylvania, United States. The trophy does not represent the entire regular season's most valuable player, the award goes simply to the best basketball player for Big 5 games played that season. It has been given since 1956 and is granted by the Herb Good Basketball Club. Members of the Philadelphia Big 5 are La Salle University, the University of Pennsylvania, Saint Joseph's University, Temple University and Villanova University.

Key

Winners

Winners by school

References
General
 Sports Staff of the Philadelphia Daily News. (2005). The Big 5-0: The Big 5 Turns 50.  Philadelphia Daily News.  
Specific

Awards established in 1956
College basketball trophies and awards in the United States
La Salle Explorers men's basketball
Penn Quakers men's basketball
Philadelphia Big 5
Saint Joseph's Hawks men's basketball
Sports in Philadelphia
Temple Owls men's basketball
Villanova Wildcats men's basketball
1956 establishments in Pennsylvania